Iced is a 1988 American slasher film directed by Jeff Kwitny, and produced by Robert Seibert. It stars Debra De Liso, Doug Stevenson, Elizabeth Gorcey, Ron Kologie, Joseph Alan Johnson (who also wrote the screenplay), and Lisa Loring. The plot follows a group of friends who are mysteriously invited to a ski resort, where they are stalked and murdered by a masked killer.

Plot

A group of childhood friends witness the demise of their friend who was accidentally killed, during skiing, over the love of a woman. Five years later, they have been invited to the opening of a ski resort. A murderous assailant, donned in ski-clothing, has targeted them and one by one begins to stalk and kill them.

Cast
Debra De Liso as Trina (credited as Debra DeLiso)
Doug Stevenson as Cory
Ron Kologie as Carl
Elizabeth Gorcey as Diane
John C. Cooke as John
Joseph Alan Johnson as Alex Bourne
Dan Smith as Jeff Stinson
Michael Picardi as Eddie
Lisa Loring as Jeanette
Sharon Bingham as Suzanne
Mark Turner as a Bartender
Rodney Montague as Biff

Production
Parts of the film were shot at Big Cottonwood Canyon in Utah.

Release

While the film was released on VHS by Prism Entertainment and CBS/Fox Video, it is only available on that format and, as of October 2022, has had no release on DVD or Blu-ray.

Reception

Josh G. from Oh, the Horror! gave a negative review on the film, calling it "a slasher movie that secretly wants to be a Soap Opera, and has an ending that clears nothing up."

References

External links
 
 

1988 films
1988 horror films
American independent films
American slasher films
American teen horror films
1988 independent films
1980s slasher films
1980s serial killer films
1980s horror thriller films
1980s teen horror films
1980s mystery films
American films about revenge
Films shot in Utah
American mystery horror films
1980s English-language films
1980s American films